Skylight is an unincorporated community in Boston Township, of southwestern Washington County, Arkansas, United States. Skylight lies about one mile west-northwest of Skylight Mountain (elev. ).

References

Unincorporated communities in Washington County, Arkansas
Unincorporated communities in Arkansas